Pognon is a surname. Notable people with the surname include:

Christophe Pognon (born 1977), Beninese tennis player
Elisabeth Ekoué Pognon (born 1937), first female judge in Benin
Henri Pognon (1853–1921), French epigrapher and Assyriologist
Ronald Pognon (born 1982), French sprint athlete